Sinchets is a small mountain village in Ardino Municipality, Kardzhali Province, southern-central Bulgaria. It covers an area of 8.602 square kilometres and as of 2007 had a population of 70 people.

References

Villages in Kardzhali Province